Indian Australians or Indo-Australians are Australians of Indian ancestry. This includes both those who are Australian by birth, and those born in India or elsewhere in the Indian diaspora. Indian Australians are one of the largest groups within the Indian diaspora, with 783,958 persons declaring Indian ancestry at the 2021 census, representing 3.1% of the Australian population.In 2019, the Australian Bureau of Statistics estimated that 721,050 Australian residents were born in India.

Indians are the youngest average age (34 years) and the fastest growing community both in terms of absolute numbers and percentages in Australia.

In 2017–18 India was the largest source of new permanent annual migrants to Australia since 2016, and overall third largest source nation of cumulative total migrant population behind England and China, 20.5% or 33,310 out of 162,417 Australian permanent resident visas went to the Indians who also additionally had 70,000 students were studying in Australian universities and colleges, and Hindi (ranked 8th with 0.7% of total population) and Punjabi (ranked 10th with 0.6% of total population) are among the top 10 languages spoken in Australia. The largest Indian Australian population is found in the state of Victoria. Among Indian origin religions, which also include non-Indians, are Buddhist (2.4% of total population or 563,700 people), Hindus (1.9% or 440,300) and Sikhs (0.5% or 125,900).

As of 2016, Indians were the highest educated migrant group in Australia with 54.6% of Indians in Australia having a bachelor's or higher degree, more than three times Australia's national average.

The long history of Indian migration to Australia has progressed "from 18th-century sepoys and lascars (soldiers and sailors) aboard visiting European ships, through 19th-century migrant labourers and the 20th century’s hostile policies to the new generation of skilled professional migrants of the 21st century... India became the largest source of skilled migrants in the 21st century."History

 Pre-history migration of Indians (2300 BCE–2000 BCE) 

A study of Indigenous Australian DNA has found that Indigenous Australians may have mixed with people of Indian origin about 4,200 years ago. The same study showed that flint tools and Indian dogs may have been introduced from India at about this time. A 2012 paper reports that there is also evidence of a substantial genetic flow from India to northern Australia estimated at slightly over four thousand years ago, a time when changes in tool technology and food processing appear in the Australian archaeological record, suggesting that these may be related. One genetic study in 2012 by Irina Pugach and colleagues at the Max Planck Institute for Evolutionary Anthropology has suggested that about 4,000 years before the First Fleet landed in Australia (in 1788), some Indian explorers had settled in Australia and assimilated into the local population in roughly 2217 BC. The study by the Max Planck Institute for Evolutionary Anthropology found that there was a migration of genes from India to Australia around 2000 BCE. The researchers had two theories for this: either some Indians had contact with people in Indonesia who eventually transferred those genes from India to Aboriginal Australians, or that a group of Indians migrated all the way from India to Australia and intermingled with the locals directly. This also explains with the Vedda people of Sri Lanka; some of their facial features look very similar to the Australo-Melanesians, which are part of the Australoid race. It is now clear that this was the result of Andamanese aborigines intermixing with Indo-Aryan migrants; these same people (referring to the Andamanese) also shared ancestry with the Dravidians after intermixing with the now extinct Elamites (distinct from the modern Iranian peoples; they also shared ancestry with the Indo-Aryans).

 Indian connection with European exploration of Australia (1627–1787) 

In 1627 the south coast of Australia was accidentally discovered by the Dutch East India Company explorer François Thijssen and named '''t Land van Pieter Nuyts, in honour of the highest ranking passenger, Pieter Nuyts, extraordinary Councillor of India. In 1628 a squadron of Dutch East India Company ships was sent by the Governor-General of the Dutch East Indies Pieter de Carpentier to explore the northern coast. These ships made extensive examinations, particularly in the Gulf of Carpentaria, named in honour of de Carpentier. The Dutch East India Company ship, Duyfken, led by Willem Janszoon, made the first documented European landing in Australia in 1606.

The London press reported in June 1768 that two ships would be sent to the newly discovered island and from there to "attempt the Discovery of the Southern Continent". The British East India Trade Committee recommended in 1823 that a settlement be established on the coast of northern Australia to forestall the Dutch, and Captain J.J.G. Bremer, RN, was commissioned to form a settlement between Bathurst Island and the Cobourg Peninsula.

Colonial era (1788–1900) 

Indian immigration from British India to Australia began early in history of Australian colony. The first Indians arrived in Australia with the British settlers who had been living in India.

The people of the first British fleet to establish a new colony, which landed on 26 January 1788, included seamen, marines and their families, government officials, and a large number of convicts, including women and children. All had been tried and convicted in Great Britain and almost all of them in England. However, many are known to have come to England from other parts of Great Britain and, especially, from Ireland; at least 12 were identified as black (born in India, Britain, Africa, the West Indies, North America, or a European country or its colony).
 In 1788, Indian crews from Bay of Bengal came to Australia on trading ships.

Between 1788 and 1868 on board 806 ships in all about 164,000 convicts were transported to the Australian colonies, 1% were from the British outposts in India and Canada, Maoris from New Zealand, Chinese from Hong Kong and slaves from the Caribbean. British colonial convict ships from Britain and elsewhere to Australia frequently stopped over in India, many of which were built in India, and among those ships with convicts started the initial sail from India include HMS Duchess of York which sailed from Bengal in India and arrived at Port Jackson on 4 April 1807 carrying merchandise and rice also transported two military convicts, Hunter arrived on 20 August 1810, Indian arrived on 16 December 1810, Amboyna arrived in Australia on 1 January 1822, Cawdry arrived on 1 January 1826 from India and Ceylon, Edward Lombes on 6 January 1833, and Swallow arrived on 23 October 1836. Almorah sailed from Britain and stopped over at Madras and Bengal in 1818.

In the late 1830s, more Indians started to arrive in Australia as indentured labourers when the penal transport of convicts to New South Wales (which at the time also consisted of Queensland and Victoria) was slowing, before being abolished altogether in 1840. The lack of manual labourers from the convict assignment system led to an increase demand for foreign labour, which was partly filled by the arrival of Indians who came from an agrarian background in India, and thus fulfilled their tasks as farm labourers on cane fields and shepherds on sheep stations well. In 1844, P. Friell who had previously lived in India, brought 25 domestic workers from India to Sydney and these included a few women and children. Among the earliest Indians was a Hindu Sindhi merchant, Shri Pammull, who after arrived in 1850s built a family opal trade in Melbourne which still prosperously continues with his fourth-generation descendants. "Initially, the migrants from India were indentured labourers, who worked on sheep stations and farms around Australia. Some adventurers followed during the gold rush of the 1850s. A census from 1861 indicates that there were around 200 Indians in Victoria of whom 20 were in Ballarat, the town which was at the epicenter of the gold rush.  Thereafter, many more came and worked as hawkers - going from house to house, town to town, traversing thousands of kilometers, making a living by selling a variety of products."

From the 1860s, Indians, most of them Sikh, worked as merchants, industrialists, and businessmen to operate throughout outback Australia, as 'pioneers of the inland'. The 1881 census records 998 people who were born in India but this had grown to over 1700 by 1891.

Between 1860s to 1900 period when small groups of cameleers were also shipped in and out of Australia at three-year intervals, to service South Australia's inland pastoral industry by carting goods and transporting wool bales by camel trains, who were commonly referred to as "Afghans" or "Ghans", despite their origin often being mainly from British India, and some even from Afghanistan and Egypt and Turkey. Majority of cameleers, including Indian cameleers, were Muslims with a sizeable minority were Sikhs from Punjab region, they set up camel-breeding stations and rest house outposts, known as caravanserai, throughout inland Australia, creating a permanent link between the coastal cities and the remote cattle and sheep grazing stations until about the 1930s, when they were largely replaced by the automobile.

Since Federation (1901–present)

During the White Australia policy (1901–1973) 

From federation in 1901 until the 1973 immigration of non-whites, including Indians, into Australia was restricted due to the enactment of the White Australia policy. The laws made it impossible for Indians to enter the country unless they were merchants or students, who themselves were only allowed in for short periods of time. Historians place the number of Indians in Australia at federation in 1901 somewhere between 4700 and 7600. According to the 1911 census, there was only 3698 'Indians' signifying a large decrease, with the trend continuing, with only approximately 2200 'Indians' in the country in 1921. After 1901 Immigration Restriction Act was introduced by the Australian Government the migration [of non-white migrants] from India was curtailed, but following India's independence from Britain in 1947, the number of Indian-born Anglo-western white British citizens emigrating to Australia increased, along with migration of mixed race European-Indians, such as Anglo-Indians, Dutch Anglo-Indians and Portuguese Indians. The 1901 Immigration Restriction Act, one of the first laws passed by the new Australian parliament, which was the centrepiece of the White Australia Policy aimed to restrict immigration from Asia, where the population was vastly greater and the standard of living vastly lower and was similar to measures taken in other settler societies such as the United States, Canada and New Zealand. While Labor Party wanted to protect "white" jobs and pushed for clearer restrictions, Free Trade Party's MP Bruce Smith said he had "no desire to see low-class Indians, Chinamen or Japanese...swarming into this country... But there is obligation...not (to) unnecessarily offend the educated classes of those nations".

During World War I (1914–1918) Indian and Australian troops were deployed together in several sectors, including in Europe, Middle East, Africa, Egypt and Turkey. During Gallipoli Campaign the Australians and New Zealanders troops were deployed to take part in the operation, although they were outnumbered by the British, Indian and French contingents, a fact which is often overlooked today by many Australians and New Zealanders. Australian nurses also staffed 10 British colonial hospitals in India.

During World War II (1939–1945) the hundreds of Australians were posted to British units in Burma and India. Hundreds of Australians also served with RAF units in India and Burma, and in May 1943 330 Australians were serving in forty-one squadrons in India, of which only nine had more than ten Australians. In addition, many of the RAN's corvettes and destroyers served with the British Eastern Fleet where they were normally used to protect convoys in the Indian Ocean from attacks by Japanese and German submarines. Indian, Australian and British troops made a disorganised last stand at Singapore, before surrendering to Japan and Indian National Army of Subhas Chandra Bose's Azad Hind on 15 February 1942, which led to weakening of British empire and eventual independence of India in 1947.

Since the end of the White Australia policy (1973–present) 

The end of White Australia policy saw a boom in migration of middle-class skilled professionals, by 2016 over 2 in every 3 migrants who arrived were skilled professionals mainly from India, UK, China, South Africa and Philippines, "to work as doctors and nurses, human-resources and marketing professionals, business managers, IT specialists, and engineers...who were not fleeing war or poverty. The Indians in Australia are predominantly male, while the Chinese are majority female." Indians are the largest migrant ethnic group in Melbourne and Adelaide, fourth largest in Brisbane, and likely to jump from third place to second place in Sydney by 2021. In Melbourne, the suburbs of Docklands, Footscray, Sunshine and Tarneit have higher concentration of Indians specially the students. In Sydney, Parramatta [and neighbouring suburbs such as Harris Park and Westmead, etc.] have higher concentration of migrants. By 2019, the number of Indians grew at nine times the annual national average growth, and number of overseas student visas and post-study work visas also exploded.

Between 2007 and 2010, the violence against Indians in Australia controversy took place, and a subsequent Indian Government investigation concluded that, of 152 reported racially motivated assaults against Indian students in Australia in 2009, 23 involved racial overtones. In the year 2007–2008, 1,447 Indians had been victims of crime including assaults and robberies in the state of Victoria in Australia. In either case, the Victorian police refused to release the data for public scrutiny, the stated reason being that it was "problematic: as well as 'subjective and open to interpretation'". Indian media have accused the Australian authorities of being denialist. On 9 June 2009, Indian Prime Minister, addressing the Indian Parliament said that "he was 'appalled' by the senseless violence and crime, some of which are racist in nature," Indian students held protests in Melbourne and Sydney, which were sparked by an earlier attack on Indians by Lebanese Australian men.

Demographics

783,958 persons declared Indian ancestry (whether alone or in combination with another ancestry) at the 2021 census, representing 3.1% of the Australian population. In 2019, the Australian Bureau of Statistics estimated that 721,050 Australian residents were born in India.

At the 2021 census the states with the largest number of people nominating Indian ancestry were: New South Wales (350,770), Victoria (250,103), Queensland (93,648), Western Australia (77,357) and South Australia (43,598).

In 2009 there were an additional 90,000 Indian students studying at Australian tertiary institutions according to Prime Minister Rudd.

Historical population trends 

This table only reflects the people who were born in India, and not all the people who have the Indian ancestry such as the second generation Indian Australians or the first generation Indian Australians from Indian diaspora nations e.g. Fiji, Singapore, Malaysia, Hong Kong, Suriname, Guyana, etc. Prior to 1947 India's Independence and simultaneous partition, the Pakistani Australian and Bangladeshi Australian as nations did not exist as these were part of British India, hence these are also included in the demography of Australian Indians till 1947.

Indian languages

Hindi and Punjabi languages, with 159,652 and 132,496 speakers, are among top 10 language spoken at home in Australia. Other Indian languages and their respecting speaker in Australia are Tamil (73,161), Bengali (54,566), Malayalam (53,206), Gujarati (52,888), Telugu (34,435), Marathi (13,055), Kannada (9,701), Konkani (2,416), Sindhi (1,592), Kashmiri (215), and Odia (721). Number of Hindi speakers by state in 2018, were NSW (67,034), Victoria (51,241), Queensland (18,163), Western Australia (10,747), South Australia (7,310), ACT (3,646), NT (852), and Tasmania (639). 81% of Punjabi speakers are Sikhs, 13.3% are Hindus and 1.4% are Muslims.

Indian origin religions 

According to the 2016 census, majority of Indian Australians are Hindus with about 444,000 individuals who profess Hinduism. Hinduism is also the fastest growing religion in Australia. 
There are minority of Indian Australians who also follow Sikhism, Buddhism, Jainism, Christianity, Islam, Zoroastrianism and others.

Hindus in Australia grew to 3,698 by 1911, 21,000 by 1981, 41,730 by 1986, 43,000 by 1991, 67,270 by 1996, 95,000 by 2001, 145,000 by 2006, 275,000 by 2011, and 2% of the Australian population by 2016. In 1971 first ISKON Hare Krishna centre in Sydney was established by Swami Prabhupada, and in 1977 the first Hindu temple of Australia the Sri Mandir Temple was built in Auburn in NSW, followed by the establishment of Sydney Lord Murukan temple in 1985. In 2015, Daniel Mookhey becomes the first Australian MP to be sworn into office by swearing his/her oath on the Bhagavad Gita. In 2018, Kaushaliya Vaghela becomes the first Indian-born Hindu Member of Parliament in any Australian Parliament.

The states and territories with the highest proportion of Sikhs are Victoria (0.89%) and the Australian Capital Territory (0.54%), whereas those with the lowest are the Northern Territory (0.28%) and Tasmania (0.10%).

Socio-economic status 

In 2016, it was revealed 54.6% of Indian migrants in Australia hold a bachelor's degree or a higher educational degree, more than three times Australia's national average of 17.2% in 2011, making them the most educated demographic group in Australia.

India annually contributes the largest number of migrants to both Australia and New Zealand. According to census figures from 2016, among India-born residents in Australia, the median income was $785, higher than the corresponding figure for all overseas-born residents at $615, and all Australia-born residents at $688.

In popular media 
"Indians and the Antipodes: Networks, Boundaries and Circulation" 2018 book edited by Sekhar Bandyopadhyay and Jane Buckingham "is the first book that seeks to juxtapose histories of Indian migration to Australia and New Zealand in a comparative framework to show their interconnectedness as well as dissimilarities. Side by side with stories of collective suffering and struggles of the diaspora, it focuses on individual resilience, enterprise and social mobility. It analyses 'White Australia' and 'White New Zealand' policies of the early twentieth century to point to their interconnected histories. It also looks critically at the more recent migration, its changing nature and the challenges it poses to both the migrant communities and the host societies."

Notable Indian Australians

Indian ancestry
Anupam Sharma, Filmmaker, Australia Day Ambassador, film entrepreneur
Aravind Adiga, Novelist, winner of the 2008 Man Booker Prize
Purushottama Bilimoria, Professor at Deakin University
Anusha Dandekar, Actress
Shibani Dandekar, Actress
Chennupati Jagadish AC, pioneer in nanotechnology
Zinnia Kumar Scientist and International Fashion Model
Kersi Meher-Homji, Journalist and Author
Mahesh Jadu, Actor
Maria Thattil, Activist, Beauty Queen and Model of South Indian descent who was crowned Miss Universe Australia 2020 and placed Top 10 at Miss Universe 2020
Marc Fennell, film critic, technology journalist, radio personality, author and television presenter
Tharini Mudaliar, Singer and Actress who played a role in The Matrix Revolutions (movie) and Xena: Warrior Princess
Indira Naidoo, Newsreader
Neel Kolhatkar, Comedian
Pankaj Oswal, controversial businessman, accused of embezzlement
Vimala Raman, Actress
Chandrika Ravi, Actress
Pallavi Sharda, Actress
Partho Sen-Gupta, Filmmaker
Lisa Sthalekar, Captain of Australia Women's cricket team
Mathai Varghese, Mathematician and Professor at the University of Adelaide
Peter Varghese, Diplomat and Secretary of the Department of Foreign Affairs and Trade (Australia) 
Akshay Venkatesh, Mathematician
Kaushaliya Vaghela, former Victorian politician, community leader. 
Dr. Manjula O'Connor, Psychiatrist, social worker, leading activist and campaigner against dowry deaths and domestic violence in Indian community in Victoria & Australia.
Guy Sebastian, Winner of 2003 Australian Idol, Singer and Songwriter
Isha Sharvani, Bollywood actress

European–Indian ancestry
Christabel Chamarette, Senator from Western Australia from 1992 to 1996
Stuart Clark, Australian Cricketer
Chris Crewther, former Liberal MP for Dunkley
Samantha Downie, Australia's Next Top Model Contestant, Model
Jeremy Fernandez, ABC weekend presenter and reporter
Lisa Haydon, Bollywood Actress
Samantha Jade, Singer, Songwriter and Actress
Sam Kerr, Footballer
Daniel Kerr, Australian rules footballer 
Roger Kerr, Australian rules footballer
Jordan McMahon, Australian rules footballer
Lauren Moss, ALP MP for Casuarina in the Northern Territory
Clancee Pearce, Australian Rules Footballer for Fremantle Football Club
Eric Pearce, former Hockey Player who represented Australia in 4 Olympics
Julian Pearce, former Hockey Player who represented Australia in 45 international matches
Rex Sellers, Cricketer and Leg Spinner who played for Australia in India in 1964
Dave Sharma, former Liberal MP for Wentworth
Lisa Singh, ALP Senator representing Tasmania
Terry Walsh, Australian Hockey Player and Coach
Anne Warner, former Minister for Aboriginal and Islander Affairs, Queensland Labor Government
Rhys Williams, Professional footballer

See also

 Australia–India relations
 Fijian-Indian Australians
 Non-resident Indian and person of Indian origin
Pakistani Australians
Bangladeshi Australians
Punjabi Australians
 Australian Sikh Heritage Trail
 Man Mohan Singh (pilot)
 Romani people in Australia

References

External links
 Indian Magazine and Newspaper in Australia
 Indians Living in Australia 
 Indian Communities in Australia

Immigration to Australia
Australia
 
Asian Australian